Glinnik  is a village in the administrative district of Gmina Brańsk, within Bielsk County, Podlaskie Voivodeship, in north-eastern Poland.

In 2005 the village had a population of 220 people.

References

Glinnik